The 1923 Harvard Crimson football team represented Harvard University in the 1923 college football season. In its fifth season under head coach Bob Fisher, Harvard compiled a 4–3–1 record and outscored opponents by a total of 75 to 55. Charles Hubbard was the team captain. The team played its home games at Harvard Stadium in Boston.

Schedule

References

Harvard
Harvard Crimson football seasons
Harvard Crimson football
1920s in Boston